Geoffrey O'Neill Cochrane (1951 – November 2022) was a New Zealand poet, novelist and short story writer. He published 19 collections of poetry, a novel and a collection of short fiction. Many of his works were set in or around his hometown of Wellington, and his personal battles with alcoholism were a frequent source of inspiration.

Life and career
Cochrane was born in Wellington in 1951 and attended St Patrick's College. His family were Catholic, and he has described his father as a "frustrated painter" who worked for New Zealand's betting organisation, the TAB.

His first five poetry collections were published by private presses, beginning with Images of Midnight City in 1976. He began to write full-time in 1990, after giving up alcohol. In 1992 a collection of poems from his earlier collections, plus 27 new poems, was published as Aztec Noon by Victoria University Press (VUP). His publicist at VUP, Kirsten McDougall, noted "his work was widely ignored by those who give out prizes and seats at festivals". The Oxford Companion to New Zealand Literature describes his poetry as "spare in form and precise in language", and of an "often melancholy mood". Alcoholism and Wellington often feature in his poetry. 

Cochrane published two novels, Tin Nimbus (1995) and Blood (1997). Both are about an alcoholic's experiences with institutions in late 1970s Wellington, reflecting Cochrane's personal experiences. Tin Nimbus was a regional finalist in the 1996 Commonwealth Writers' Prize for best first book. A review of Blood for The Sunday Star-Times said Cochrane "has injected into this full-blooded novel the futility and bewilderment, the fear and loathing, of everyday life"; The Evening Post compared it to the later work of Jack Kerouac. Of his short fiction, collected in Astonished Dice (2014), reviewer Grant Smithies for The Sunday Star Times has said Cochrane "has a poet's economy with language, an alcoholic's understanding of pain, a lapsed Catholic's feel for mystery; a cinematographer's eye for a strong image".

In 2009 he was awarded the Janet Frame Prize for Poetry. In eight out of the twelve years from 2003 to 2014, and in 2019 and 2020, his poems were selected for the online anthology Best New Zealand Poems. His 2007 entry in the anthology, "Chemotherapy", was written about the death of New Zealand author Nigel Cox. In 2010 he received the first Nigel Cox Unity Books Award. 

In 2014 Cochrane was made an Arts Foundation of New Zealand Laureate as one of New Zealand's "most outstanding practising artists". 

Cochrane died at his home in Wellington in November 2022, aged 71. New Zealand's poet laureate Chris Tse wrote a poem in tribute titled "Starship (version)".

Selected works

Poetry collections

 Images of Midnight City (1976)
 Solstice (1979, with Victoria Broome and Lindsay Rabbitt)
 The Sea the Landsman Knows (1980) 
 Taming the Smoke (1983)
 Kandinsky's Mirror (1989) 
 Aztec Noon (1992) 
 Into India (1999) 
 Acetylene (2001) 
 Vanilla Wine (2003) 
 White Nights (2004) 
 Hypnic Jerks (2005) 
 84-484 (2007) 
 Pocket Edition (2009) 
 The Worm in the Tequila (2010) 
 The Bengal Engine's Mango Afterglow (2012) 
 Wonky Optics (2015) 
 Rededits (2017) 
 The Black and the White (2019) 
 Chosen (2020)

Other work
 Tin Nimbus (1995, novel) 
 Blood (1997, novel) 
 Astonished Dice (2014, short fiction)

References

External links
 Profile on Read NZ Te Pou Muramura website
 Interview of Cochrane by Damien Wilkins in the spring 2003 issue of Sport
 "Chemotherapy", poem by Cochrane published in Best New Zealand Poems (2007)

1951 births
2022 deaths
20th-century New Zealand poets
20th-century New Zealand novelists
20th-century New Zealand short story writers
20th-century New Zealand male writers
21st-century New Zealand poets
21st-century New Zealand novelists
21st-century New Zealand short story writers
21st-century New Zealand male writers
People from Wellington City
People educated at St. Patrick's College, Wellington